Rhoicinaria is a genus of South American tangled nest spiders first described by H. Exline in 1950.  it contains only two species.

References

Amaurobiidae
Araneomorphae genera
Spiders of South America